The 2005 Chinese FA Cup (Chinese: 2005中国足球协会杯) was the 11th edition of Chinese FA Cup. The matches of first round were kicked off on 26 March 2005, and the final took place on 20 November 2005.

Results

First round

 Liaoning FC advanced to the second round as Harbin Guoli was dissolved on 1 April 2005.

Second round

First leg

Second leg

Quarter-finals

First leg

Second leg

Semi-finals

First leg

Second leg

Final
The final is a single match, with extra time and penalty shootout if necessary.

See also
2005 Chinese Super League Cup

References

2005
2005 in Chinese football
2005 domestic association football cups